The Philipse family was a prominent Dutch family in New Netherlands and the British Province of New York.  It owned both the vast  hereditary estate in lower Westchester County, New York, Philipsburg Manor, the family seat, and the roughly  Highland Patent, later known as the "Philipse Patent", in time today's Putnam County, New York.

Loyalists during the Revolutionary War, the family had its lands seized in 1779 by the Revolutionary government of the Province of New York and sold by its Commissioners of Forfeitures. Though never compensated for their losses by the Colonial government, various family members did receive payments from the British government in following years.

History
The family is of partial Bohemian origin on its paternal side. Frederick Philipse (1636-1702), first Lord and founder of Philipsburg Manor, had eleven children with his first wife, Margaret Hardenbrook de Vries. She died in 1691. A year later, Frederick married the widow Catharine Van Cortlandt Derval, who survived him for many years. 

She was the sister of Stephanus Van Cortlandt, an adviser to the provincial governor. Her brother Jacobus Van Cortlandt married Frederick's adopted daughter Eva and their son Frederick Van Cortlandt later built the Van Cortlandt House in Van Cortlandt Park in the Bronx, New York.  Jacobus and Eva's daughter, Mary, was the mother of John Jay by her marriage to Peter Jay.

Principal offspring

 Adolphus Philipse In 1697 Adolphus, Frederick's second son, purchased a tract from Dutch traders which received British Royal sanction as the Highland Patent.  Subsequently, known as the "Philipse Patent", the roughly  parcel extended eastward from the Hudson River at the northern border of Westchester County some 20 or so miles to the Colony of Connecticut.

 Philip Philipse, the eldest and heir to the Manor, hereditary title, and family commercial holdings, died in either 1699 or 1700. By predeceasing his father, the legacy that would have gone to Philip bypassed him and was distributed between Adolphus and Philip's son, Frederick Philipse II. By the terms of Frederick Philipse's last will and testament, dated 26 October 1700, proved 1702, Adolphus received all the Manor north of Dobb's Ferry, including the present town.  He was also named proprietor of a tract of land on the west bank of the Hudson north of Anthony's Nose and executor of Philip's estate.

 Frederick Philipse II After the bachelor Adolphus' death in 1749 (Smith, others 1750), his Manor holdings and the Highland Patent passed to his nephew, Frederick Philipse II, his only heir-at-law, who became the second Lord of the Manor at Philipsborough.

 Frederick Philipse III On Frederick II's death in 1751 all Manor holdings and the title went to his eldest son Frederick Philipse III, the third and final Lord of the Manner of Philipsburg.  The Highland Patent – today's Philipse Patent – was divided among Frederick II's surviving offspring, son Philip Philipse, and daughters, Susannah (wife of Beverley Robinson), Mary (wife of Col. Roger Morris), and Margaret (who died intestate in 1752, her share being divided among the other three).  It is claimed, without citation, that Frederick III leased the entirety of his property to a William Pugsley before siding with the British in the American Revolution and leaving New York City for England in 1783.

Other descendants

Eva Philipse, adopted daughter of Frederick Philipse I, born Eva de Vries 1660, married Jacobus van Cortlandt
Margaret Philipse (b. 1733-1752), youngest daughter of Frederick II, heiress to one quarter of Philipse Patent, died intestate. Share redistributed to siblings Philip, Mary, and Susanna before 1754.
Philip Philipse (1724–1768), son of Frederick Philipse II, partial heir to Philipse Patent.
Susanna Philipse (1727–1822), eldest surviving daughter of Frederick Philipse II, married to Beverley Robinson, mother of Frederick Philipse Robinson, partial heiress to Philipse Patent.  Possible romantic interest of George Washington.
Mary Philipse (1730–1825) , middle surviving daughter of Frederick Philipse II, and possible early romantic interest of George Washington, loyalist, wife of British Colonel Roger Morris, owner of the Mount Morris in Manhattan. Partial heiress to Philipse Patent.
 Margaret Philipse (1733-1752), youngest surviving daughter of Frederick Philipse II and one quarter heir to the Philipse Patent, who died before it was passed on to her.
Sir Frederick Philipse Robinson (1763–1852), son of Susannah Philipse and Colonel Beverley Robinson, who fought for England during the American Revolution.
John Jay (1745–1829), delegate and president of Continental Congress, U.S. minister to Spain, 1st Chief Justice of the United States
William Jay (1789–1858)  , prominent jurist and reformer, active abolitionist
Henry Brockholst Livingston (1757–1823), Justice of US Supreme Court
John Marshall Brown (1838–1907), Captain and assistant. adjunct. general of ME volunteers and served in SC and FL; commanded regiment at Totopotomy and Cold Harbor and preliminary movements a Petersburg, VA.
Samuel Sprigg Caroll (1832–1893) , military officer in Northern VA campaign and Battle Cedar Mountain; commandant brigade at battles of Fredericksburg, Chancellorsville and Gettysburg.
Matthew Clarkson (1758–1825), major-general of NY State Militia; served with Gen. B. Lincoln until end of Revolutionary War, participated in siege of Savannah, defense of Charleston, present at surrender of Yorktown (1781).
Alexander Slidell MacKenzie (1842–67), an officer in the United States Navy during the American Civil War and his brother General Ranald S. Mackenzie.
Jay Pierrepont Moffat (1896–1943), notable American diplomat, historian and statesman who, between 1917 and 1943, served the State Department in a variety of posts, including that of Ambassador to Canada during the first year of United States participation in World War II.
John Watts de Peyster (1821–1907),  Brigadier General in the New York State Militia during the American Civil War and philanthropist and military historian after the war.
Jonathan Mayhew Wainwright III (1864–1945),  US Congressman and Army officer in the Spanish–American War.
 Charlotte Margaret  Philipse (Grand Daughter of Frederick Philipse II). Married Edward Webber, Lieutenant-General of the English military and lived in Wales.
 James Phillips Webber (1797-1877), son of Edward Webber and hence great grandson of Frederick Philipse II, obtained  a grant of land in  Paterson, NSW, Australia in 1822. He lived there until 1835, when he left the colony and eventually settled in La Maddalena, Sardinia, Italy, where he built Villa Webber (Villa Webber is named after him.) In 1943 Benito Mussolini was imprisoned in Villa Webber.
 John Phillips Webber (1800-1845), son of Edward Webber, also received a grant of land in New South Wales, Australia, and lived there for a while before returning to London, where he died in 1845.
 Edward Montgomery Affleck Webber (1802-1884), son of Edward Webber, lived in Wales all his life, in the Overton, Erbistock area.

References

Families from New York (state)